Joaelton (born 11 March 1988 in Indaiatuba, Brazil) is a Brazilian footballer who is last known to have played for New Radiant S.C. of the Maldivian Dhivehi Premier League in 2014.

Playing career
While playing in Nicaragua, Joaelton reported being the victim of racist abuse from opposing club's staff and supporters.

Signed by New Radiant in the Maldives for 2014, Joaelton was involved in a serious car accident during his stay there, causing him to be incapacitated and undergo surgeries. Shortly afterwards, his agent and New Radiant decided to cancel his contract by mutual understanding.

Later in 2014, Joaelton moved to Angola where he played for Sporting Clube de Cabinda in the Girabola.

References

External links 

 at Soccerway

Expatriate footballers in the Maldives
1988 births
Brazilian expatriate footballers
Expatriate footballers in Nicaragua
Footballers from São Paulo (state)
Association football forwards
Brazilian footballers
Real Estelí F.C. players
Living people
People from Indaiatuba